Franck Tanasi (born 22 December 1959) is a French former professional footballer who played as a left-back.

Honours 
Paris Saint-Germain
 French Division 1: 1985–86
Coupe de France: 1982–83; runner-up: 1984–85

References

External links 
 

1959 births
Living people
Sportspeople from Fort-de-France
Martiniquais footballers
French footballers
French people of Martiniquais descent
Association football fullbacks
Paris Saint-Germain F.C. players
Paris FC players
US Orléans players
AS Poissy players
Championnat National players
Ligue 1 players
Ligue 2 players
Championnat National 2 players